Great Vengeance and Furious Fire is the debut studio album by English rock band The Heavy, released 17 September 2007 in the United Kingdom and 8 April 2008 in the United States. The album was released by Ninja Tune's new rock-based imprint Counter Records. The title is a reference to a line spoken by Samuel L. Jackson's character Jules Winnfield in Pulp Fiction.

Track listing

References

2007 debut albums
The Heavy (band) albums
Ninja Tune albums